James Newell Stannard (2 January 1910 – 19 September 2005) is a radiobiologist, pharmacologist and physiologist at the National Institutes of Health.

Atomic Energy Project
The Atomic Energy Project at the University of Rochester was a graduate teaching program. 
The project had three divisions. William Freer Bale headed the Radiology and Biophysics division that worked largely on radioactive materials—for example, radium, radon, plutonium, and polonium. Stannard was responsible for 2 sections, the Radiation Toxicology section and the Radioautography section. Harold Hodge headed the Pharmacology and Toxicology division that focused on Uranium including inhalation studies. Joe W. Howland, M.D. headed the clinically oriented Medical Services division. Herbert Mermagen worked in the Medical Physics section was a radiological physicist, known today as a health physicist.

Health Physics Society

Service
 Education and Training Committee, Chairman
 Board of Directors, 1965–1971
 President-Elect, 1968–1969
 President, 1969–1970

Awards and honors
 Distinguished Scientific Achievement Award
 Founders Award
 Fellow Award
 J. Newell Stannard Lecture Series, “Excellence in Radiation Protection”, annual symposium

References

1910 births
2005 deaths
Oberlin College alumni
Harvard University alumni
University of Rochester faculty
Emory University faculty
National Institutes of Health people
University of California, San Diego faculty
Health physicists
Health Physics Society